The Evangeline Trail is a scenic roadway in the Canadian province of Nova Scotia.

It is located in the western part of the province, bringing visitors to the Minas Basin, the Annapolis Valley and the Gulf of Maine.  The route connects Mount Uniacke in Hants County with Yarmouth at the Bay Ferries terminal where ferries connect to Maine in the United States.

The route measures .

Name
The route is named after the principal character in the epic poem Evangeline by Henry Wadsworth Longfellow.  The region from Yarmouth to Halifax via the Annapolis Valley was first connected by the Dominion Atlantic Railway, which is credited with instigating the province's nascent tourism industry during the early 20th century; the DAR was titled "The Land of Evangeline Route" and the Evangeline Trail pays homage to this transport predecessor.

Communities include 

Lower Sackville
Mount Uniacke
Windsor
Hantsport
Wolfville
New Minas
Kentville
Berwick
Aylesford
Kingston
Middleton
Lawrencetown
Bridgetown
Annapolis Royal
Digby
Weymouth
Church Point
Meteghan
Yarmouth

Parks
 Oaklawn Farm Zoo
 Annapolis Royal Historic Gardens

Museums
Uniacke Estate Museum
Shand House Museum
Fort Edward National Historic Site
Halliburton House Museum
Grand Pre National Historic Site
Randall House Museum
Greenwood Military Museum
MacDonald Museum
North Hills Museum
Fort Anne National Historic Site
Habitation at Port-Royal
St. Mary's Church (Church Point)
Firefighters' Museum of Nova Scotia
Yarmouth County Museum

Highways
Trunk 1
Highway 101

External links
Evangeline Trail
Literary inspiration. Westworld Alberta

Roads in Hants County, Nova Scotia
Roads in Kings County, Nova Scotia
Roads in Annapolis County, Nova Scotia
Roads in Digby County, Nova Scotia
Roads in Yarmouth County
Scenic travelways in Nova Scotia